Andrei Borisovich Skopintsev (born September 28, 1971) is a Russian former professional ice hockey defenceman who currently is an assistant coach for Dynamo Moscow in the KHL. During his playing career, which lasted from 1989 to 2012, he played for several teams in Russia and North America, including the Tampa Bay Lightning and Atlanta Thrashers of the National Hockey League. Internationally Skopintsev played for Russia at five World Championships.

Career
Skopintsev began his career with Kristall Elektrostal before moving to Krylja Sovetov, where he spent six seasons.  In 1995, he moved to Germany's Deutsche Eishockey Liga where he spent one season with the Augsburger Panther. There, he pulled out his best scoring numbers of his career. Despite his reputation as a stay-at-home defenceman, Skopintsev scored 10 goals and 20 assists for 30 points in 46 games.

He moved on to Finland's SM-liiga in 1996 and played for TPS Turku for two seasons. During that time, Skopintsev was drafted 153rd overall in the 1997 NHL Entry Draft by the Tampa Bay Lightning.

In spite of his strong reputation he built in Europe, Skopintsev never managed to emulate his performances, bouncing between the NHL and the International Hockey League.  He played for the Tampa Bay Lightning and then the Atlanta Thrashers, playing 40 regular season games, scoring 2 goals and 4 assists for 6 points, collecting 32 penalty minutes.  After three mediocre season in the American league, Skopintsev returned in Russia in 2001 and spent five seasons with HC Dynamo Moscow and in 2006 he signed with Vityaz Chekhov.

Career statistics

Regular season and playoffs

International statistics

External links
 

1971 births
Living people
Atlanta Thrashers players
Augsburger Panther players
Cleveland Lumberjacks players
Detroit Vipers players
Dynamo Balashikha players
HC Dynamo Moscow players
HC MVD players
HC Sibir Novosibirsk players
HC TPS players
HC Vityaz players
Krylya Sovetov Moscow players
Orlando Solar Bears (IHL) players
People from Elektrostal
Russian ice hockey coaches
Russian ice hockey defencemen
Soviet ice hockey defencemen
Soviet Wings players
Tampa Bay Lightning draft picks
Tampa Bay Lightning players
Sportspeople from Moscow Oblast